The 1978 Nice International Open, also known by its sponsored name Montano-Snauwaert International Championships,  was a men's tennis tournament played on outdoor clay courts at the Nice Lawn Tennis Club in Nice, France, and was part of the 1978 Colgate-Palmolive Grand Prix. It was the seventh edition of the tournament and was held from 17 April until 23 April 1978. First-seeded José Higueras won the title.

Finals

Singles
 José Higueras defeated  Yannick Noah 6–3, 6–4, 6–4
 It was Higueras' 2nd singles title of the year and the 4th of his career.

Doubles
 François Jauffret /  Patrice Dominguez defeated  Jan Kodeš /  Tomáš Šmíd 6–4, 6–0

References

External links
 ITF tournament edition details

Nice International Open
1978
Nice International Open
Nice International Open
20th century in Nice